Diphenylacetylene is the chemical compound C6H5C≡CC6H5. The molecule consists of two phenyl groups attached to a C2 unit. A colorless solid, it is used as a building block in organic synthesis and as a ligand in organometallic chemistry.

Preparation and structure
In one preparation for this compound, benzil is condensed with hydrazine to give the bis(hydrazone), which is oxidized with mercury(II) oxide. Alternatively stilbene is brominated, and the resulting dibromodiphenylethane is subjected to dehydrohalogenation.  Yet another method involves the coupling of iodobenzene and the copper salt of phenylacetylene in the Castro-Stephens coupling. The related Sonogashira coupling involves the coupling of iodobenzene and phenylacetylene.

Diphenylacetylene is a planar molecule. The central C≡C distance is 119.8 picometers.

Derivatives
Reaction of diphenylacetylene with tetraphenylcyclopentadienone results in the formation of hexaphenylbenzene in a Diels–Alder reaction. Reaction of Ph2C2 with benzal chloride in the presence of potassium t-butoxide affords the 3-alkoxycyclopropene which converts to the cyclopropenium ion.

References

Phenyl compounds
Alkyne derivatives